This list of members of the 79th West Virginia House of Delegates lists the presumed members of the House of Delegates for the 79th West Virginia Legislature.

House of Delegates Leadership

List of Members in the House of Delegates by District

Composition 
2009–2011:

See also 
West Virginia House of Delegates
List of members of the 78th West Virginia House of Delegates
List of speakers of the West Virginia House of Delegates

External links 
West Virginia Legislature Homepage
WV House of Delegates District Map
Secretary of State – 2008 General Election Returns Results (PDF)

West Virginia legislative sessions
M
79